Burrangong was an electoral district of the Legislative Assembly in the Australian state of New South Wales created in the 1904 re-distribution of electorates following the 1903 New South Wales referendum, which required the number of members of the Legislative Assembly to be reduced from 125 to 90. It was named after Burrangong station, the first squatting run in the Young area and consisted of parts of the abolished districts of Boorowa, Grenfell and Young. In 1920, with the introduction of proportional representation, it was absorbed along with Yass into Cootamundra.

Members for Burrangong

Election results

References

Former electoral districts of New South Wales
1904 establishments in Australia
Constituencies established in 1904
1920 disestablishments in Australia
Constituencies disestablished in 1920